The White Jurassic or White Jura ( or Weißjura) in earth history refers to the upper of the three lithostratigraphic units of the South German Jurassic, the latter being understood not as a geographical, but a geological term in the sense of a lithostratigraphic super group. Formerly and even occasionally today in the popular scientific literature, this term is equated to the chronostratigraphic series of the Upper Jurassic. This is however not quite correct, because the White Jura does not exactly coincide with the chronostratigraphic boundaries of the Upper Jurassic. In addition, the term Malm, which was formerly frequently used as a synonym should no longer be used in connexion with the South German Jurassic. Instead the term "Malm" should be reserved for the roughly equivalent lithostratigraphic unit in the North German Jurassic. The White Jurassic was deposited  about 161-150 million years ago. The White Jurassic follows the lithostratigraphic unit of the Brown Jurassic. Its upper boundary is erosive. Locally the White Jurassic is overlain with a large stratigraphic hiatus of the Regensburg Green Sandstone (Cenomanian).

Literature 
 Gert Bloos, Gerd Dietl & Günter Schweigert: Der Jura Süddeutschlands in der Stratigraphischen Tabelle von Deutschland 2002. Newsletters on Stratigraphy, 41(1-3): 263-277, Stuttgart, 2005, 
 Eckhard Mönnig: Der Jura von Norddeutschland in der Stratigraphischen Tabelle von Deutschland 2002. Newsletters on Stratigraphy, 41(1-3): 253-261, Stuttgart, 2005.
 Friedrich August Quenstedt: Das Flözgebirge Würtembergs. Mit besonderer Rücksicht auf den Jura. Verlag der Laupp'schen Buchhandlung, Tübingen, 1843.
 Friedrich August Quenstedt: Der Jura. Verlag der Laupp’schen Buchhandlung, Tübingen, 1856-57.

External links 
Deutsche Stratigraphische Kommission (ed.): Stratigraphische Tabelle von Deutschland 2002, Potsdam, 2002.  pdf
Geologische Übersicht der Schichtenfolge in Baden-Württemberg (pdf; 183 kB)
Oberjura in Baden-Württemberg (pdf; 27.6 kB)

White Jura
Jurassic System of Europe
Geologic formations of Germany